Bram van Kerkhof (born 1 November 1948) is a Dutch football midfielder and later manager.

References

1948 births
Living people
Dutch footballers
SBV Vitesse players
K.A.A. Gent players
Cercle Brugge K.S.V. players
K.V. Oostende players
Eredivisie players
Dutch expatriate footballers
Expatriate footballers in Belgium
Dutch expatriate sportspeople in Belgium
Association football midfielders
Dutch football managers
Cercle Brugge K.S.V. managers
K.V. Oostende managers
Dutch expatriate football managers
Expatriate football managers in Belgium